Glipa cinereonigra is a species of beetle in the genus Glipa. It was described in 1893.

References

cinereonigra
Beetles described in 1893